Bessemer City School District is a school district in Jefferson County, Alabama first established in 1887.  It is the second oldest public school system in the state's most populated county.

Schools
 J. S. Abrams Elementary (K-5)
 Charles F. Hard Elementary (K-5; originally founded 1894)
 Greenwood Elementary (K-5) (founded 1937; operated as a Jefferson County School until 1966 when it was ceded to Bessemer)
 Jonesboro Elementary (K-5)
 Westhills Elementary (K-5)
 New Horizon Alternative 
 Bessemer City Middle (6-8) (opened during 2013–14 school year) (building was previously Jess Lanier High School)
 Bessemer City High (9-12)
 Bessemer Center for Technology

Former schools (partial list)
 Abrams High (closed 1987)
 Arlington Elementary (built 1910 and served as the first Bessemer High School until 1923; building demolished)
 Carver High School (all black student body) was located at 600 2nd Avenue North
 Clarendon High School (circa 1890s until 1910) (then became an Elementary School with the same name)
 James A. Davis Middle  (originally called Clarendon Avenue Elementary; opened 1953, closed 2013; building demolished)
 Dunbar High School
 Jess Lanier High School (1970-2010)
 Roberts School (believed to be the first school in the system, likely built in the late 1880s; served grades 1-12 until construction of Clarendon High School)

Failing schools
Based on the state standardized testing, this system had two schools in the bottom six percent statewide, marking them as "failing."
 Abrams Elementary School 
 Bessemer City High School

See also
 Education in Alabama

References

External links
 

Education in Jefferson County, Alabama
School districts in Alabama
1887 establishments in Alabama
School districts established in 1887